New Market is an unincorporated community and census-designated place (CDP) in Madison County, Alabama, United States, and is included in the Huntsville-Decatur Combined Statistical Area. As of the 2020 census, the population of the CDP was 1,543. Although it was the first area settled in Madison County, the town has never been incorporated.

History
In the early 19th century, several persons from Tennessee explored the area just across the border in what eventually became Madison County in Alabama. Isaac and Joseph Criner also explored the area and, in 1804, settled in the northern part near what is now called the Mountain Fork of the Flint River. George Smith, landowner of the town site, built the first log house and established a mercantile business in 1814. John Miller excavated a millrace and erected a gristmill and sawmill in 1819. Later settlers gave the name "New Market" to the community.

Four sites in New Market are listed on the National Register of Historic Places: the New Market Historic District, New Market Presbyterian Church, New Market United Methodist Church, and the Whitman-Cobb House. New Market is also home to the Mount Paran Cemetery, a historic cemetery recognized by the Alabama Register of Landmarks and Heritage and home to the graves of New Market pioneers including Isaac Criner and John Miller.

Geography
New Market is located in northeastern Madison County at  (34.906295, -86.426170).

The Mountain Fork of the Flint River flows through the northern part of the community.

Demographics

New Market first appeared on the 1880 U.S. Census as an unincorporated community of 144 residents. It did not appear again on the census for 110 years until 1990, when it was classified as a census-designated place (CDP).

2000 census
As of the census of 2000, there were 1,864 people, 692 households, and 534 families residing in the CDP. The racial makeup of the CDP was 87.18% White, 6.28% Black or African American, 2.25% Native American, 0.16% Asian, 1.34% from other races, and 2.79% from two or more races. 3.54% of the population were Hispanic or Latino of any race.

There were 692 households, out of which 38.0% had children under the age of 18 living with them, 61.7% were married couples living together, 10.8% had a female householder with no husband present, and 22.8% were non-families. 19.1% of all households were made up of individuals, and 6.8% had someone living alone who was 65 years of age or older. The average household size was 2.67 and the average family size was 3.05.

In the CDP, the population was spread out, with 26.1% under the age of 18, 8.3% from 18 to 24, 35.2% from 25 to 44, 19.5% from 45 to 64, and 10.9% who were 65 years of age or older. The median age was 35 years. For every 100 females, there were 101.3 males. For every 100 females age 18 and over, there were 101.3 males.

The median income for a household in the CDP was $42,985, and the median income for a family was $46,696. Males had a median income of $36,204 versus $18,188 for females. The per capita income for the CDP was $18,799. About 7.5% of families and 11.2% of the population were below the poverty line, including 14.7% of those under age 18 and 7.8% of those age 65 or over.

2010 census
As of the census of 2010, there were 1,597 people, 632 households, and 454 families residing in the CDP. The population density was 91 people per square mile (35/km). The racial makeup of the CDP was 88.5% White, 6.7% Black or African American, 1.4% Native American, 0.2% Asian, 1.9% from other races, and 1.3% from two or more races. 4.4% of the population were Hispanic or Latino of any race.

There were 632 households, out of which 28.6% had children under the age of 18 living with them, 56.3% were married couples living together, 10.4% had a female householder with no husband present, and 28.2% were non-families. 23.6% of all households were made up of individuals, and 7.6% had someone living alone who was 65 years of age or older. The average household size was 2.53 and the average family size was 3.00.

In the CDP, the population was spread out, with 22.9% under the age of 18, 9.3% from 18 to 24, 24.3% from 25 to 44, 31.3% from 45 to 64, and 12.3% who were 65 years of age or older. The median age was 41.1 years. For every 100 females, there were 101.9 males. For every 100 females age 18 and over, there were 106.4 males.

The median income for a household in the CDP was $42,857, and the median income for a family was $51,250. Males had a median income of $36,250 versus $27,068 for females. The per capita income for the CDP was $22,043. About 11.9% of families and 14.6% of the population were below the poverty line, including 35.3% of those under age 18 and 21.1% of those age 65 or over.

2020 census

As of the 2020 United States census, there were 1,543 people, 475 households, and 369 families residing in the CDP.

Public services
Water service in the New Market area is run by the Madison County Water Authority. Sewer service is unavailable. Huntsville Utilities provides electric service.

The Madison County Sheriff's Department administers law and order in the community, and the New Market Volunteer Fire Department provides fire protection.

Education
New Market is home to several schools run by the Madison County Schools school district, which is the school district of New Market.

K-8 schools
 New Market School
 Walnut Grove Elementary School
Middle schools
 Buckhorn Middle School
High schools
 Buckhorn High School

Notable people
 Joe W. Davis, mayor of Huntsville from 1968 to 1988
 Whitney Dean, guitarist and vocalist of The Sweeplings, a pop-folk duo
 Holly Helms, vocalist in The Springs, a country music duo
 Woodall Rodgers, mayor of Dallas, Texas from 1939 to 1947
 Sam Streeter, baseball pitcher in the Negro leagues from 1920 to 1936
 T. T. Terry, first mayor of Huntsville, serving from 1916 to 1918

References

External links

Census-designated places in Madison County, Alabama
Census-designated places in Alabama
Huntsville-Decatur, AL Combined Statistical Area